Bijaći is a village in Croatia,  northeast of Trogir, at the contact point between the Trogir part and the Lower Kaštela part of the Velo field. 

It was first mentioned in two old Croatian documents from AD 852 (Byaci) and AD 892 (Biaci). At the locality of Stombrate are the remains of an early Croatian church of St. Martha, mentioned in 1197. It is a three-nave structure with an angular apse and a bell tower on the front, built on the remains of an early Christian three-nave basilica. The remains of other structures, as well as the late antique and early Croatian cemetery have been discovered close to the ruins. 

Numerous fragments of pleter from the 9th and the 10th centuries have been found as well. Interesting are the parts of the altar partition, pediments and beams, and particularly the reconstructed quadrilateral ciborium (today kept at the Museum of Croatian Archaeological Monuments in Split) with part of an inscription. Six stone lintels have also been found in the vicinity of the church. They belonged to the buildings of the ducal palace. 

Biaći was one of better equipped occasional residences of the Croatian national rulers. The church of St. Martha was probably destroyed during Turkish invasions.

External links

Srednjovjekovna arheologija II 

Geography of Split-Dalmatia County
Former capitals of Croatia
9th century in Croatia
10th century in Croatia
Archaeological sites in Croatia